Miriam Breitman was a Canadian variety television series which aired on CBC Television in 1968.

Premise
Host Miriam Breitman was joined by Lenny Breau, a vocal trio and Bob McMullin conducting the show's orchestra in this Winnipeg-produced series. Breitman's guests included Manitoba musicians such as Ray St. Germain.

Scheduling
This half-hour series was broadcast on Wednesdays at 5:30 p.m. from 3 July to 25 September 1968.

References

External links
 

CBC Television original programming
1968 Canadian television series debuts
1968 Canadian television series endings
1960s Canadian variety television series